Leonardo Sormani (working ca 1550- ca 1590) was an Italian sculptor of secondary reputation, originally from Savona, who is recorded as living in Rome from the 1550s until about 1590. He is best known for his bust of Cardinal Rodolfo Pio da Carpi (died 1564) in the Church of Santa Trinità dei Monti, Rome,  for the sculpture of the pope and allegorical figures on the tomb of Pope Nicholas IV in the Basilica of Santa Maria Maggiore, where his patron was Cardinal Peretti, soon to be Sixtus V, and for the funeral portrait of Pope Pius V (died 1572) in Sixtus' chapel in the same basilica

Notes

16th-century Italian sculptors
Italian male sculptors
People from the Province of Savona
1550s births
1590s deaths